A Writ of Kalikasan is a legal remedy under Philippine law that provides protection of one's constitutional right to a healthy environment, as outlined in Section 16, Article II of the Philippine Constitution, which states that the "state shall protect and advance the right of the people to a balanced and healthful ecology in accord with the rhythm and harmony of nature." Kalikasan is a Filipino word for "nature".

The writ is comparable to the writ of amparo and the writ of habeas corpus.  In contrast, this writ protects one's right for a healthy environment rather than constitutional rights. The Writ of Kalikasan originated in the Philippines, whereas the two aforementioned writs have roots in European and Latin American law.

History
Provision for the Writ of Kalikasan was written in 2010 by the Supreme Court of the Philippines under Rule 7 of the Rules of Procedure for Environmental Cases as a Special Civil Action. The Supreme Court under Chief Justice Reynato Puno took the initiative and issued Rules of Procedure for Environmental Case because Section 16, Article II of the Philippines' 1986 Constitution was not a self-executing provision.

Cases
The Writ of Kalikasan may be sought to deal with environmental damage of such magnitude that it threatens life, health, or property of inhabitants in two or more cities or provinces.

In September 2014, the Supreme Court of the Philippines ruled unanimously against issuing a Writ of Kalikasan against the United States Government over the grounding of the USS Guardian on the Tubbataha Reef in 2013.

See also 
 Environmental issues in the Philippines

References

Law of the Philippines
Constitutional law
Kalikasan
Environmental justice
Presidency of Gloria Macapagal Arroyo
Right to a healthy environment